Geelong Arena is the home of former National Basketball League team the Geelong Supercats who now play in the NBL1.  The arena has the majority of its 2,000 seating capacity on the broadcast side of the court with two smaller sections at each end plus two levels of corporate boxes on the opposite to the broadcast side.

After the Supercats had their NBL licence revoked following the 1996 NBL season the arena still played host to occasional NBL games with former Melbourne based teams the Victoria Titans/Victoria Giants and the South Dragons all playing one or two games there a season. The arena also hosts occasional Australian Boomers games such as at the 2003 FIBA Oceania Championship where they won the gold medal.

In 2005, the arena received a major upgrade with the installation of a state of the art sprung wooden floor and the installation of new rings with all improvements meeting international specifications as well as receiving new electronic scoreboards.  All work was completed in time for the 2006 Commonwealth Games.

Geelong Arena also hosts numerous functions and concerts by artists such as Kelly Clarkson, Suzi Quatro Shannon Noll, Midnight Oil, The Wiggles, John Farnham and The Beautiful Girls, among others.

References

External links

Buildings and structures in Geelong
Sport in Geelong
Geelong Supercats
Defunct National Basketball League (Australia) venues
Basketball venues in Australia
Netball venues in Victoria (Australia)
Music venues in Australia
2006 Commonwealth Games venues
Sports venues in Victoria (Australia)